Staropeschanoye is a rural locality (a selo) in Novopeschansky Selsoviet, Burlinsky District, Altai Krai, Russia. The population was 5 as of 2013. It was founded in 1826.

Geography 
Staropeschanoye is located near the Burla river, on the Peschannoye Lake, 32 km northeast of Burla (the district's administrative centre) by road. Novoalexeyevka is the nearest rural locality.

References 

Rural localities in Burlinsky District